Great Jewish Music: Marc Bolan is a tribute album featuring the music of English singer/songwriter Marc Bolan of the band T.Rex. Produced by Danny Cohen, it was released on John Zorn's label Tzadik Records in 1998 as part of their series on "Radical Jewish Culture", following similar prior tributes to Burt Bacharach and Serge Gainsbourg.

After covering the song "Would I Be the One?" on this album, Sean Lennon recorded a different version and included that version on his 2006 album Friendly Fire. Lennon said that he did this because he liked his arrangement of the 1998 version, but was unhappy about the quality of the recording, since it was recorded on a four-track recorder due to Zorn's limited album budget of $400 or $500.

Fantômas's cover of "Chariot Choogle" for this album was the first official release by that band.

Track listing
 "Children of the Revolution" - Arto Lindsay and Marc Ribot - 2:41
 "Telegram Sam" - Rebecca Moore - 4:27
 "Get It On" - Kramer - 3:49
 "Buick MacKane" - Melvins - 3:07
 "Groove a Little" - Medeski Martin & Wood - 4:13
 "Cosmic Dancer" - Lo Galluccio - 4:47
 "Chariot Choogle" - Mike Patton as Fantômas - 1:51
 "Ride a White Swan" - Tall Dwarfs - 3:05
 "Rip Off" - Chris Cochrane - 3:40
 "Deboraarobed" - Gary Lucas - 2:44
 "Mambo Sun" - Eszter Balint - 3:51
 "Jeepster" - Vernon Reid - 4:33
 "Lunacy's Back" - Danny Cohen - 2:45
 "Life's A Gas" - Elysian Fields - 4:11
 "Would I Be the One?" - Sean Lennon and Yuka Honda - 3:36
 "Love Charm" - Cake Like - 2:48
 "Scenescof" - Trey Spruance - 1:41
 "20th Century Boy" - Buckethead - 7:24
 "Romany Soup" - Lloyd Cole - 3:55

Personnel

"Children of the Revolution"
Melvin Gibbs - Bass
Dougie Bowne - Drum programming
Marc Ribot - Guitar, producer
Arto Lindsay - Vocals, guitar, producer
Eddie Sperry - Engineering, mixing
Anthony Coleman - Sampler
"Telegram Sam"
Stephen Vitiello - Guitar, mixing
Rebecca Moore - Producer, vocals, bass, sampler, Synthesizer, Violin, mixing
"Get It On"
Charles Curtis - Cello
Kramer - Producer, voice, instruments
Tess - Vocals
"Buick MacKane"
Mark Deutrom - Bass, producer
Dale Crover - Drums, producer
King Buzzo - Guitar, producer
"Groove A Little"
Billy Martin - Drums, producer
Chris Wood - Guitar, producer
John Medeski - Keyboards, producer
Scotty Hard - Producer
"Cosmic Dancer"
Banjo Victor - Guitar
Lo Galluccio - Producer, vocals, synthesizer
"Chariot Choogle"
Mike Patton - Producer, vocals, instruments
"Ride a White Swan"
Dr. Rhythm - "Drums thru a fuzz box"
Chris Knox - Backing guitar, handclaps, lead vocals, producer
Alec Bathgate - Guitar, handclaps, Backing vocals, producer
"Rip-Off"
JD Foster - Bass, sampler
Chris Cochrane - Producer, vocals, instruments

"Deboraarobed"
Gary Lucas - Slide guitar, Electronics, vocals, producer
Murray Weinstock - producer
"Mambo Sun"
JD Foster - Bass, sampler, producer
Christine Bard - Drums
Jim Pugliese - Drums
Chris Cochrane - Guitar
Ted Reichman - Organ
Martin Bisi - Engineering
Eszter Balint - Vocals, violin
"Life's A Gas"
Oren Bloedow - Instruments, producer
Jennifer Charles - Vocals, producer
"Would I Be The One?"
Sean Lennon - Producer, vocals, instruments
Yuka Honda - Producer, vocals, instruments
"Love Charm"
Kerri Kenney - Bass, vocals
Jody Seifert - Drums, vocals
Nina Hellman - Guitar, vocals
Craig Wedren - Producer, mixing
Kevin McMahon - Producer, mixing
"Scenescof"
Phil Franklin - Percussion
Trey Spruance - Producer, vocals, organ, guitar, Toy piano
"20th Century Boy"
Buckethead - Producer, guitar, bass, Tambourine
Travis Dickerson - Engineering
Pinchface - Vocals, drums
"Romany Soup"
Self Righteous Brothers - Producer
Lloyd Cole - Vocals, instruments

Credits
Suehiro Maruo - Artwork
Ikue Mori - Design
John Zorn - Executive producer
David Newgarden - Executive producer
Kazunori Sugiyama - Executive producer
Allan Tucker - Mastering
Marc Bolan - Music, Lyrics

References

 
 

Tribute albums
1998 compilation albums
Tzadik Records compilation albums